Kingold Jewelry is a Chinese jewelry company with its headquarters in the Huangpu Science & Technology Park in Jiangan District, Wuhan, Hubei. It also has an office in New York City.  the chairperson is Jia Zhihong and the company is the largest gold processor in the province that is not owned by the Chinese government nor provincial nor local governments.

The company had several trust products but investors in 2019 never received money they asked for. Dongguan Trust Co. Ltd., which investigated Kingold in order to liquidate its capital, found that some purported gold bars used as collateral were copper with gold plating. The loans were to be worth $2.8 billion U.S. dollars.

References

External links
 Kingold Jewelry (United States)
 Kingold Jewelry (China) 

Companies listed on the Nasdaq
Gold industry
Manufacturing companies based in Wuhan
Publicly traded companies of China